Mount Coot-tha was an electoral district in the Legislative Assembly of Queensland in the state of Queensland, Australia from 1950 to 2017.

The electoral district encompassed suburbs in Brisbane's inner-west, including Milton, Auchenflower, Paddington, Red Hill, Bardon and parts of the suburbs of Toowong, Kelvin Grove and Ashgrove. The district took its name from nearby Mount Coot-tha.

Mount Coot-tha was consistently the strongest-performing Queensland state seat for the Greens—22.2 per cent in 2015, 20.7 per cent in 2012 and 23.1 per cent in 2009.

Mount Coot-tha was abolished in a redistribution in 2016 which took effect at the 2017 state election. Most of its territory, including Mount Coot-tha, was merged with the bulk of Indooroopilly to form Maiwar, with other portions being transferred to the districts of Cooper and McConnel.

Members for Mount Coot-tha

Election results

References

External links
 

Former electoral districts of Queensland
1950 establishments in Australia
2017 disestablishments in Australia
Constituencies established in 1950
Constituencies disestablished in 2017